Mary Gertrude  (born Anne Greene, 1884–1965), was an Australian nurse and provincial superior, and a member of the Sisters of St. John of God.

Early life 
Born in Killard, County Clare, Ireland, she settled in Australia around 1905.

Vocation 
She worked as a nurse in hospitals run by her order in Western Australia. In 1929, she began serving at the order's mission in north Western Australia, where she was influential in securing a hospital for Aboriginal Australian patients with leprosy. She cared for patients in the hospital for ten years.

Mother Mary Gertrude was appointed provincial superior of her order in the North-West in 1947, and served two six-year terms.  She became a member of the Most Excellent Order of the British Empire in 1948. After her service as provincial superior, she was appointed superior of the Sisters of St. John of God convent in Derby.

Death 
She died as the result of a car accident in Broome, on 20 February 1965. She is buried in the Broome cemetery.

References 

1884 births
1965 deaths
People from County Clare
20th-century Australian Roman Catholic nuns
Irish emigrants to Australia (before 1923)